In the 1954–1955 season, the North Carolina Tar Heels men's basketball team competed in a total of twenty-one games and finished with a record of 10–11. The team finished the season in sixth place in the Atlantic Coast Conference.

Schedule and results

December 4	Clemson	H	W	99–66
December 9	South Carolina	H	W	88–69
December 11	William & Mary	A	L	76–79
December 18	Maryland	H	L	60–70
Dixie Classic
December 27	USC (-/13)	RAL	W	67–58
December 28	NC State (-/2)	RAL	L	44–47
December 29	Duke (-/18)	RAL	W	65–52
January 3	LSU	A	L	77–84
January 4	Alabama (-/13)	A	L	55–77
January 8	Wake Forest	H	W	95–78
January 11	Virginia	H	W	96–87
January 14	South Carolina	A	W	73–64
January 15	Clemson	A	W	95–87
January 18	NC State (-/2)	A	W	84–80
February 4	Duke	H	L	68–91
February 11	Virginia	GR	L	73–98
February 12	Maryland (-/11)	A	L	61–63
February 16	Wake Forest	A	W	83–79
February 22	NC State (-/6)	H	L	75–79
February 25	Duke	A	L	74–96
ACC Tournament
March 3	Wake Forest	RAL	L	82–95

Roster

References

North Carolina Tar Heels men's basketball seasons
North Carolina
Tar
Tar